Chylonia is a district of Gdynia, Poland, located in the northern part of the city.

Chylonia was a royal village of the Kingdom of Poland, administratively located in the Puck County in the Pomeranian Voivodeship.

Transport
The Gdynia Chylonia and Gdynia Leszczynki railway stations are located in Chylonia.

References

Districts of Gdynia